113 may refer to:
113 (number), a natural number
AD 113, a year
113 BC, a year
113 (band), a French hip hop group
113 (MBTA bus),  Massachusetts Bay Transportation Authority bus route
113 (New Jersey bus), Ironbound Garage in Newark and run to and from the Port Authority bus route

See also 
 11/3 (disambiguation)
Nihonium, synthetic chemical element with atomic number 113